Athletics is one of the sports at the quadrennial East Asian Games competition. It has been one of the sports held at the Games since the inaugural edition in 1993.

Editions

See also
East Asian Games records in athletics

External links
Past East Asian Games athletics medallists 1993–2005 from GBR Athletics
East Asian Games Athletics

 
East Asian Games
East Asian Games
Defunct athletics competitions